The Anderson Ferry is a ferry across the Ohio River between Cincinnati, Ohio and Constance, Kentucky. It has been in continuous operation since 1817. It was originated by George W Anderson the founder of the business, sold to the Kottmyer family then known as the Kotmeyer ferry and was later sold back to the Anderson family in 1986. The ferry was often used in the 19th century by Kentucky farmers bringing their product to market in Cincinnati. It is the lone survivor of dozens of ferries that once served the Cincinnati area.

The ferry connects Anderson Ferry Road (a major arterial street on the Ohio side which traverses the City of Cincinnati; Delhi Township; and Green Township from south to north) with a short private road, which in turn connects with Kentucky Route 8 (the middle section) just east of its junction with Kentucky Route 20 near Constance, Kentucky.  A short distance southwest from this junction is KY 20's junction with Kentucky Route 212, which provides the main access to the Cincinnati/Northern Kentucky International Airport. It provides a shortcut for Cincinnati westsiders going to the airport located in Boone County, Kentucky.  Price (January 2020) for a one-way ride with a car is $5.00; or a book of 10 tickets can be had for $35.00. In 2020 and 2021, the ferry saw a record amount of usage as closures and construction on the Brent Spence Bridge led to more vehicles utilizing the service.

See also 
 Piatt's Landing, Kentucky: historic ferry landing also in Boone County
 National Register of Historic Places listings in Boone County, Kentucky

References

External links

Anderson Ferry Information Website 
The Anderson Ferry
Anderson Ferry Photography

1817 establishments in Kentucky
1817 establishments in Ohio
Ferries of Ohio
Ferries of Kentucky
Crossings of the Ohio River
Transportation in Cincinnati
National Register of Historic Places in Boone County, Kentucky
National Register of Historic Places in Cincinnati
Historic districts on the National Register of Historic Places in Ohio
Historic districts on the National Register of Historic Places in Kentucky
Transportation in Boone County, Kentucky
Water transportation buildings and structures on the National Register of Historic Places